The Long Beach School District is a public school district based in Long Beach, Mississippi (United States).

Schools
Long Beach High School
2007 National Blue Ribbon School
Long Beach Middle School 
Harper McCaughan Elementary School 
Thomas L. Reeves Elementary School 
2000-2001 National Blue Ribbon School
W. J. Quarles Elementary School

Demographics

2006-07 school year
There were a total of 2,818 students enrolled in the Long Beach School District during the 2006–2007 school year. The gender makeup of the district was 50% female and 50% male. The racial makeup of the district was 13.45% African American, 81.41% White, 1.70% Hispanic, 3.05% Asian, and 0.39% Native American. 37.0% of the district's students were eligible to receive free lunch.

Previous school years

Accountability statistics

See also
List of school districts in Mississippi

References

External links
 

Education in Harrison County, Mississippi
School districts in Mississippi